Phillip Martin Robinson Jr. (born December 28, 1980) is a non-profit executive and American politician who is a member of the Ohio House of Representatives from the 19th district in Cuyahoga County.

Early life and education 
Robinson attended Gilmour Academy in Gates Mill, Ohio, and later earned an undergraduate degree in finance from George Washington University in Washington, D.C. He also received an Executive Master of Business Administration from Case Western Reserve University Weatherhead School of Management.

Career 
Robinson's first role in political life was as a congressional aide for U.S. Sen. Dianne Feinstein. He has also served as executive director of City Year Cleveland.

Ohio House of Representatives

Election
Robinson was elected in the general election on November 6, 2018, winning 51 percent of the vote over 49 percent of Republican candidate Jim Trakas, flipping the seat from Republican control to Democratic control.

Committees
Robinson serves on the following committees: Primary and Secondary Education, Public Utilities, Ways and Means, and Joint Education Oversight Committee.

Personal life
Robinson is the brother of comedian Phoebe Robinson.

Election results

References

Robinson, Phil
Living people
21st-century American politicians
1980 births
George Washington University alumni
Case Western Reserve University alumni
African-American state legislators in Ohio